Étienne Émile Marie Boutroux (28 July 1845 – 22 November 1921) was an eminent 19th-century French philosopher of science and religion, and a historian of philosophy. He was a firm opponent of materialism in science. He was a spiritual philosopher who defended the idea that religion and science are compatible at a time when the power of science was rising inexorably. His work is overshadowed in the English-speaking world by that of the more celebrated Henri Bergson. He was elected membership of the Academy of Moral and Political Sciences in 1898 and in 1912 to the Académie française.

Biography
Émile Boutroux was born at Montrouge, now in the Hauts-de-Seine département, near Paris. He attended the lycée Napoléon (now lycée Henri IV), and graduated in 1865 to the École Normale Supérieure. He then continued his education at Heidelberg University between 1869 and 1870 where he was taught by Hermann von Helmholtz and encountered German philosophy.

His first employment was the post of philosophy professor at the lycée in Caen. In 1874 he published his book on which he based his doctoral thesis. The Contingency of the laws of the nature was an analysis of the implications of Kantian philosophy for science.

Between 1874 and 1876 Boutroux taught at the Faculty of Letters at the University of Nancy and while there he fell in love with and married Aline Poincaré the sister of the scientist and mathematician Henri Poincaré. In 1880 his son, Pierre, was born. Pierre Boutroux was himself to become a distinguished mathematician and historian of science.

In 1888 Boutroux was made professor of history of modern philosophy at the Sorbonne in Paris.

He was elected a member of Academy of the Moral and Political Sciences in 1898 and in 1902 he became Director of the Thiers Foundation, a residency for France's brightest students. He was elected to the Académie Française in 1912.

Boutroux died in November 1921.

Works
 De la Contingence des Lois de la Nature (1874).
 De Veritatibus Æternis apud Cartesium (1874; translated into French by G. Canguilhem, Des Vérités Éternelles Chez Descartes, Paris: Alcan, 1927; Paris: Vrin-Reprise, 1985).
 La Grèce Vaincue et les Premiers Stoïciens (1875).
 La Monadologie de Leibnitz (1881).
 Socrate, Fondateur de la Science Morale (1883).
 Les Nouveaux Essais, de Leibnitz (1886).
 Questions de Morale et d'Éducation (1895).
 De l'Idée de Loi Naturelle dans la Science et la Philosophie Contemporaines (1895).
 Études d'Histoire de la Philosophie (1897).
 Du Devoir Militaire à Travers les Âges (1899).
 Pascal (1900).
 Essais d'Histoire de la Philosophie (1901).
 La Philosophie de Fichte. Psychologie du Mysticisme (1902).
 Science et Religion dans la Philosophie Contemporaine (1908).
 William James (1911).

Translations
 La Philosophie des Grecs, by Eduard Zeller (1877–1884).

Posthumous 
 La Nature et l'Esprit (1925).
 Études d'Histoire de la Philosophie Allemande (1926).
 La Philosophie de Kant (1926).
 Nouvelles Études d'Histoire de la Philosophie (1927).
 Leçons sur Aristote (1990).

Works in English translation
 Pascal (1902, trans. by Ellen Margaret Creak).
 William James (1911, trans. by Archibald & Barbara Henderson).
 Science and Religion in Contemporary Philosophy (1911, trans. by Jonathan Nield).
 Historical Studies in Philosophy (1912, trans. by Fred Rothwell).
 Education and Ethics (1913, trans. by Fred Rothwell).
 Science and Culture (1914, lecture).
 Natural Law in Science and Philosophy (1914, trans. by Fred Rothwell).
 The Contingency of the Laws of Nature (1916, trans. by Fred Rothwell).
 Philosophy and War (1916, trans. by Fred Rothwell).
 The Relation Between Thought and Action (1918, lecture).

Selected articles
 "War and Sophistry," The New England Magazine, Vol. LV, June 1916.
 "A Frenchman on America," The Open Court, Vol. XXXII, No. 749, 1918.

See also
 Conventionalism

References

Further reading
 Crawford, Lucy Shepard (1923). "Émile Boutroux," The Harvard Theological Review, Vol. 16, No. 1, pp. 63–80.
 Crawford, Lucy Shepard (1924). The Philosophy of Émile Boutroux as Representative of French Idealism in the Nineteenth Century. New York: Longmans, Green & Co.
 Gunn, J. Alexander (1922). "The Philosophy of Émile Boutroux," The Monist, Vol. 32, No. 2, pp. 164–179.
 Lenoir, Raymond (1923). "Emile Boutroux and the Modern Conscience," The Philosophical Review, Vol. 32, No. 5, pp. 491–511.
 Nye, Mary Jo (1979). "The Boutroux Circle and Poincaré's Conventionalism," Journal of the History of Ideas, Vol. 40, No. 1, pp. 107–120.
 Rothwell, Fred (1922). "Émile Boutroux," The Monist, Vol. 32, No. 2, pp. 161–163.

External links

 
 Works by Émile Boutroux, at Hathi Trust
 Works by Émile Boutroux, at JSTOR
 Chronology of Boutroux' life and longer Bibliography from the University of Nancy, in French
 The Academie Francaise biography of Émile Boutroux in French.

1845 births
1921 deaths
People from Montrouge
Heidelberg University alumni
Academic staff of the University of Paris
Burials at Montparnasse Cemetery
French philosophers
French Roman Catholics
Members of the Académie Française
École Normale Supérieure alumni
French historians of philosophy
Lycée Henri-IV alumni
Academic staff of Nancy-Université
French male non-fiction writers
Corresponding Fellows of the British Academy
French expatriates in Germany